Deadland is a 2009 American science fiction film directed by Damon O'Steen, written by Gary Weeks, and starring Weeks, Brian Tee, and William Katt as survivors in a post-apocalyptic society five years after the United States is destroyed in a nuclear holocaust.

Plot 
As Sean Kalos attempts to mend his relationship with Katie, his estranged wife, his cell phone goes dead.  Kalos enters a gas station and requests assistance, only to find that the phones there have also died.  The attendant, who is raptly watch a television broadcast, reveals that a nuclear war has broken out, and, outside the station, they watch the sky fill with incoming missiles.  Five years later, the world has more-or-less acclimated to the changes, and a brutal post-apocalyptic society has sprung up.  Although he had previous given up his wife for dead, Kalos attempts to avoid survivalists as he searches for her, following his discovery of an encrypted message that seemingly references her.  With the help of Shiv, a quirky codebreaker, Katos learns that his wife may be the victim of experimental research in mutated super-soldiers.  Kalos, skeptical of the existence of mutants, recruits Jax to help him rescue his wife from Commander Rufler, the brutal warlord of a local militia.  He is aided by the Underground and their leader, Red.

Cast 
 Gary Weeks as Sean Kalos
 Brian Tee as Jax
 William Katt as Shiv
 Harrison Page as Red
 Chad Mathews as Harris
 Cullen Douglas as Nathaniel
 Mark Rickard as Tereshinski
 Emily-Grace Murray as Katie
 Philip Boyd as Anderson
 William Colquitt as Commander Rufler

Production 
Deadland was shot in Georgia and California in 2007.  Writer Gary Weeks was inspired after he left his cell phone at home.  After going through technology withdrawal, he began thinking of the times when he lost access to other technological advances.  He set the film five years in the future because he wanted to show a society that had adjusted to the most pressing dangers.  He wanted the protagonist to find a reason to live, and, as a romantic, Weeks decided to make the plot a love story.

Release 
Deadland premiered at the Atlanta Film Festival on April 18, 2009.  Phase 4 Films released it on DVD on November 23, 2010.

Reception 
Jeff Marker of The Gainesville Sun wrote "Deadland demonstrates what great things can be done by talented people on a shoestring budget."  Curt Holman of Creative Loafing wrote that the plot is vague and has too many quirky characters, but the film is compelling and plausible.  Ken Hanke of the Mountain Xpress called it "a solid movie with effective direction and some very good performances."  Stina Chyn of Film Threat rated it 4/5 stars and wrote that it avoids the bleak themes of traditional post-apocalyptic films by focusing more on a love story than brutality and violence.  Justin Felix of DVD Talk rated it 2.5/5 stars and wrote, "Deadland has flaws in its pacing and acting, but it's creative enough to stand out from its low budget brethren."

References

External links 
 

2009 films
2009 independent films
2009 science fiction films
American independent films
American science fiction films
American post-apocalyptic films
Films shot in Georgia (U.S. state)
Films shot in California
2000s English-language films
2000s American films
English-language science fiction films